The year 1758 in architecture involved some significant events.

Events
 Foundations of a new Church of Sainte-Geneviève in Paris, designed by Jacques-Germain Soufflot, are begun; the structure will be completed in 1790 by his pupil Jean-Baptiste Rondelet to serve as the Panthéon.

Buildings and structures

Buildings
Perrott's Folly in Edgbaston, Birmingham, England is completed.
 The Shire Hall, Warwick, England, designed by Sanderson Miller, is completed.
 The royal water garden of Taman Sari (Yogyakarta) on Java, designed by Tumenggung Mangundipura, is begun.

Births
 Charles Wyatt, English architect working in India (died 1819)
 Approximate date – Francesco Piranesi, Italian-born architectural engraver and architect (died 1810)

Deaths
 February 10 – Thomas Ripley, English architect (born c.1683)
 April 21 – Francesco Zerafa, Maltese architect (born 1679)

References